The Gaddabouts is the first album by The Gaddabouts, released in January 2011, in the same month that band vocalist Edie Brickell released her third solo album. The band consists of Edie Brickell, drummer Steve Gadd, guitarist Andy Fairweather Low and bass player Pino Palladino.

Development 
The group built on a foundation of demo sessions performed by Brickell and Gadd in 2000. When they continued with further sessions, they recruited Fairweather Low and Palladino. The musicians developed a groove, but due to conflicting touring schedules and family commitments, they shelved the project at the time. When the four musicians got back together in 2010, they used several of the songs they composed during the previous decade, and others they wrote and recorded during the current sessions. Brickell wrote some of the songs on the same day they were recorded, on the train ride into New York City. One of the songs, "Mad Dog", was recorded in one take live, which captured an energy that Brickell feels is missing in songs that take over 15 takes to capture.

Track listing

Personnel 
The band
Edie Brickell – vocals, guitar
Steve Gadd – drums, percussion
Andy Fairweather Low – vocals, electric guitar, acoustic guitar
Pino Palladino – bass, guitar

Additional musicians
Joey DeFrancesco – piano, organ, Rhodes piano, melodica, trumpet
Gil Goldstein – accordion, Hammond B3 organ
Ronnie Cuber – baritone saxophone
Marcus Rojas – tuba
Luisito Quintero – congas
Dan Block – clarinet

Production
Producer – Steve Gadd
Engineer – Andy Smith
Mixing – Andy Smith
Recorded – Andy Smith
Mastering – Greg Calbi
Sequencing – Phil Ramone
Second engineers – Christian Baker, Dan Bucchi, Mark Johnson, Craig Luchen, Claudius Mittendorfer, Neo Tanusakdi, Tyler van Dalen
Instrument technician – Mike Burns
CD Design – Amy Beth McNeely
Cover painting – Jennifer Delilah

References

Edie Brickell albums
2011 albums